Rig Cheshmeh-ye Pain (also Romanized as Rīg Cheshmeh-ye Pā’īn; also known as Rīgcheshmeh-ye Paeen) is a village in Qaleh Qafeh Rural District, in the Central District of Minudasht County, Golestan Province, Iran. At the 2006 census, its population was 111, in 30 families.

References 

Populated places in Minudasht County